Alpinia beamanii is a monocotyledonous plant species described by Rosemary Margaret Smith. Alpinia beamanii is part of the genus Alpinia and the family Zingiberaceae.

References

beamanii
Taxa named by Rosemary Margaret Smith